The 1956 Kansas gubernatorial election was held on November 6, 1956. Democratic nominee George Docking defeated Republican nominee Warren W. Shaw with 55.46% of the vote.

Primary elections
Primary elections were held on August 7, 1956.

Democratic primary

Candidates 
George Docking, businessman
Harry Hines Woodring, former Governor and United States Secretary of War

Results

Republican primary

Candidates
Warren W. Shaw, State Representative
Fred Hall, incumbent Governor
Francis Holton
John O. Stewart

Results

General election

Candidates
Major party candidates 
George Docking, Democratic
Warren W. Shaw, Republican

Other candidates
Harry O. Lytle Jr., Prohibition

Results

References

1956
Kansas
Gubernatorial